The Sandbaggers is a British spy drama television series about men and women on the front lines of the Cold War. Set contemporaneously with its original broadcast on ITV in 1978 and 1980, The Sandbaggers examines the effect of espionage on the personal and professional lives of British and American intelligence specialists. The series was produced by Yorkshire Television, based in Leeds.

Premise
Neil D. Burnside (Roy Marsden) is Director of Operations in Britain's Secret Intelligence Service (abbreviated 'SIS'), a.k.a. MI6, although that name is never used in the series. The series follows Burnside as he oversees a small, elite group of intelligence officers, the Special Operations Section, nicknamed "Sandbaggers", composed of highly trained officers whose missions tend to be politically sensitive or especially vital, such as escorting defectors across borders (or preventing defections from the UK), carrying out assassinations, or rescuing operatives from behind the Iron Curtain.

The series depicts Central Intelligence Agency (CIA) and SIS have a co-operative agreement to share intelligence; a regular theme shows SIS as so underfunded that it has become dependent on the CIA. Burnside consequently goes to great lengths to preserve the "Special Relationship" between the CIA and SIS, most notably in the episode of the same name. Episodes frequently revolve around Burnside's frustration at trying to operate his directorate in the face of what he believes to be unwarranted bureaucratic and governmental interference, in particular from his Deputy Chief, Matthew Peele.

Series creator

The Sandbaggers was created by Ian Mackintosh, a Scottish former naval officer turned television writer, who had previously achieved success with the acclaimed BBC television series Warship. He wrote all the episodes of the first two series of The Sandbaggers, but in July 1979, during the shooting of the third series, he and his girlfriend—a British Airways stewardess—were declared lost at sea after their single-engined aircraft went missing over the Pacific Ocean near Alaska, following a radioed call for help. Some of the details surrounding their disappearance have caused speculation about what actually occurred, including their stop at an abandoned United States Air Force base and the fact that the plane happened to crash in the one small area that was not covered by either U.S. or Soviet radar.

Mackintosh disappeared after he had written just four of the scripts for the third series, so other writers were called in to bring the episode count up to seven. The Sandbaggers ends on an unresolved cliffhanger because the producers decided that no one else could write the series as well as Mackintosh had and chose not to continue it in his absence. Ray Lonnen, who played Sandbagger Willie Caine, indicated in correspondence with fans that there were plans for a follow-up season in which his character, using a wheelchair, had taken over Burnside's role as Director of Special Operations.

Because of the atmosphere of authenticity that the scripts evoked and the liberal use of "spook" jargon, there has been speculation that Mackintosh might have been a former operative of SIS or had, at least, contact with the espionage community. This has extended to speculation that his disappearance was no accident or had to do with a secret mission he was undertaking. There is a possibility that Mackintosh may have been involved in intelligence operations during his time in the Royal Navy, but no conclusive evidence has surfaced. When asked, Mackintosh himself was always coy about whether he had been a spy. It is possible that this information prompted the thriller writer Desmond Bagley to mention Mackintosh as an intelligence agent in his novel The Freedom Trap.

Whether or not Mackintosh had any experience in the world of espionage, the organisational structure of SIS depicted in The Sandbaggers is probably closer to that of the CIA than that of the SIS. There is no formal section of the SIS known as the Special Operations Section, as far as is publicly known, and there is no intelligence unit known as the Sandbaggers. However, the departures from accuracy in the show may have been deliberate, in order to avoid problems with the SIS under the Official Secrets Act. Ray Lonnen mentioned in an interview that one episode in the second series was vetoed because it dealt with sensitive information, which explains why the second series has only six episodes.

Production and story style

Most exterior filming was done in the city of Leeds and the surrounding Yorkshire countryside. Additional exterior scenes were filmed in London, Belgium and Malta. Interior studio scenes were shot on videotape.

The series is grim, though laced with black humour, depicting the high emotional toll taken on espionage professionals who operate in a world of moral ambiguity. The Sandbaggers undercuts many of the accepted conventions of the spy thriller genre: in direct contrast to the "girls, guns, and gadgets" motif established by the James Bond films of the 1960s and 70s, The Sandbaggers features ordinary people in an extraordinary line of work. There are very few action sequences, and the equipment available to the operatives is standard and often outdated. Neil Burnside is a harried spymaster who doesn't drink; Willie Caine is a secret agent who abhors guns and violence, and is paid a basic civil servant's salary. On a number of occasions, the characters explicitly disparage the fictitious world of James Bond and the romanticized view of intelligence work shared by amateurs and outsiders.

The plots are complex, multi-layered, and unpredictable: regular characters are killed off abruptly, and surprise twists abound. The dialogue is intelligent and frequently witty. The Sandbaggers consists mostly of conversation: in a typical episode, Burnside moves from office to office speaking (and arguing) with his colleagues in Whitehall and in the intelligence community. These are interspersed with scenes of the Sandbaggers operating in the field, or of the "Ops Room", where missions are coordinated and controlled.

Theme music
The title theme music, composed by jazz pianist Roy Budd, establishes its rhythmic undertone with the cimbalom, an instrument often associated with spy thrillers (John Barry, for example, used the cimbalom in his scores for The Ipcress File and The Quiller Memorandum). From series 2 onwards, the theme contains an additional organ playing the same melody line. This version (or 'mix') was also used in the opening titles of episode 2 and episode 7 of series 1).

Unusually for an episodic drama, The Sandbaggers is almost entirely devoid of incidental music. One notable exception is the last episode of series 1 (episode 7) where Burnside's feelings get the better of him for reasons the audience (by then) fully understand.

Filming locations 
Collingstone House, located at 25 Savile Row in London, was used for the exterior shots of SIS Headquarters, the location of Burnside's office. Burnside lives in a flat in Frobisher House of Dolphin Square. Wellingham's office is located in the Foreign and Commonwealth Office on Whitehall. Many scenes take place outside Wellingham's office by the Robert Clive statue on King Charles Street. The 1960, Eero Saarinen-designed US Embassy at 24 Grosvenor Square was used for exterior shots of Jeff Ross's office.

In episode 2-02, "Enough of Ghosts," Wellingham is kidnapped outside the Hilton Hotel in Brussels, now called The Hotel. Willie and Mike also stay at this hotel while they are searching for him.

In episode 2-03, "Decision by Committee," Burnside and Ross share a drink in the top floor lounge of the London Hilton on Park Lane.

In episode 2-06, "Operation Kingmaker," Peele buys a suit from a Dunn & Co. store at 373 Strand.

In episode 3-02, "To Hell with Justice," Edward Tyler stays at the Excelsior Hotel (now the Grand Excelsior) in Floriana, Malta. The final dialogue between Tyler and Burnside takes place at the Upper Barrakka Gardens.

In episode 3-06, "Who Needs Enemies," Burnside and Ross talk while walking through the Horse Guards Parade.

In episode 3-07, "Opposite Numbers," the SALT conference in Malta takes place at the Grand Hotel Verdala in Rabat and the Malta Hilton in St. Julian's.

Cast

Neil Burnside (Roy Marsden)

Neil D. Burnside is the Director of Operations (D-Ops) of the British Secret Intelligence Service (SIS, also known as MI6). Himself a former Sandbagger and a former Royal Marine, Burnside has been D-Ops for only six months at the start of the series. He is arrogant and regularly finds himself at odds with his superiors.

Sir James Greenley (Richard Vernon), "C" (series 1 and 2)

Burnside's chief superior (for the first two series) is Sir James Greenley, head of SIS, code-named "C". Owing to Greenley's diplomatic background, Burnside is initially wary of him, but over the course of the series, they develop a close relationship.

John Tower Gibbs (Dennis Burgess), "C" (series 3 only)

In the third season, Gibbs replaces Greenley as "C". A former head of station with whom Burnside has an antagonistic relationship, Gibbs disapproves of Burnside and his method of operating. His appointment (along with a continued lack of funding) leads to increased tension within SIS.

Matthew Peele (Jerome Willis), Deputy Head of SIS

Burnside is often insubordinate and even openly hostile towards Peele, his immediate superior, who in turn treats Burnside as a truculent child. Peele is generally considered a nuisance by most characters, although he is briefly a candidate to succeed Greenley as "C" (because Burnside hates Gibbs more than Peele), and demonstrates tact and intelligence throughout the series.

Sir Geoffrey Wellingham (Alan MacNaughtan)

Burnside's personal and professional life come together in Sir Geoffrey Wellingham, who is Burnside's former father-in-law and the Permanent Undersecretary of State at the Foreign and Commonwealth Office, which oversees SIS. They share an informal but sometimes antagonistic relationship which on occasion is tested to its limit, but also maintain an unspoken fondness and respect for each other.

Willie Caine (Ray Lonnen), "Sandbagger One"

Caine, a former Paratrooper, is head of the Special Operations Section. He shares a bond of friendship and trust with Burnside, and is not afraid to speak his mind. In "A Feasible Solution", Burnside describes Caine as "probably the best operative currently operating anywhere in the world". He is the only character besides Burnside to appear in every episode of the series.

Jeff Ross (Bob Sherman), head of London station, CIA

The relationship between the CIA (which has more resources) and SIS (which has more freedom of action) is pivotal in multiple episodes, represented by the friendship between Ross and Burnside. They occasionally work at odds with one another, but are most often allies fighting their common enemies (the Soviets, and bureaucracy within their own agencies). Ross often tries to push Burnside into having some kind of social life, even setting him up with fellow agent Karen Milner in the second series, but these attempts always fail.

Other characters

Burnside's personal assistant Diane Lawler (Elizabeth Bennett) has regular clashes with her boss but is fiercely loyal to him. She leaves SIS when she marries at the end of the second series, handpicking her replacement, Marianne Straker (Sue Holderness).

There are two other Sandbaggers at the beginning of the series: Jake Landy (David Glyder) and Alan Denson (Steven Grives). They are both killed and replaced for the first series by Laura Dickens (Diane Keen), the only female Sandbagger, killed at the end of the first series. The second series opens with two new Sandbaggers: Tom Elliott (David Beames), who is soon killed, and Mike Wallace (Michael Cashman), who survives as Sandbagger Two until the end of the third series.

Edward Tyler (Peter Laird) plays the SIS Director of Intelligence (D-Int), introduced in the first episode of the second series. Tyler and Burnside share a friendly relationship, but Tyler dies early in the third series and is replaced by Paul Dalgetty (David Robb). Dalgetty, who appears in only two episodes, is openly antagonistic towards Burnside, manoeuvring to replace him as D-Ops, and is briefly scheduled to do so in "Who Needs Enemies" (S03E06), owing to a KGB plot.

Sam Lawes (Brian Osborne), Brian Milton (Barkley Johnson) and Bruce (Paul Haley) are often on duty in the ops room.

Episodes
Each of the 20 episodes of The Sandbaggers runs just over fifty minutes without commercials, originally airing with commercial breaks that divided the episode into three acts. Animated bumpers similar to the end credits lead into and out of the commercial breaks.

Series 1

Series 2

Series 3

Reception

Critical review
Television critics' reviews of The Sandbaggers have been almost uniformly positive. In 1989, Walter Goodman of The New York Times dubbed The Sandbaggers "the real stuff" for fans of the spy genre. He goes on to note, concerning the seventh episode ("Special Relationship"): "Although the issue of love versus duty is overdrawn and the tale, like others, is a bit forced in places, the Burnside character and the urgency of the story-telling make it work. Most of the Sandbagger episodes work." Similarly, critic Terrence Rafferty called The Sandbaggers "the best spy series in television history".

The Sandbaggers, television critic Rick Vanderknyff also wrote, "is many things American network television is not: talky and relatively action-free, low in fancy production values but high in plot complexity, and starring characters who aren't likable in the traditional TV way".

Broadcast history
 In the United Kingdom, Series One was broadcast nationwide on ITV in September and October 1978; Series Two, January–March 1980; Series Three, June and July 1980. ITV repeated The Sandbaggers once in the 1980s. In the 1990s, the cable/satellite channels Granada Plus and SelecTV showed repeats.
 In Canada, CBC Television aired The Sandbaggers nationwide in the 1980s.
 In Australia, the Nine Network aired The Sandbaggers nationwide in 1982.
 In the United States, The Sandbaggers was sold in syndication to individual PBS stations from the mid-1980s until the mid-1990s.
 In Italy, the series was briefly shown on some local television stations in 1988. All episodes were dubbed in Italian.
 In Israel, Channel 1 aired The Sandbaggers (titled "The Selected") nationwide in the mid-1980s. All episodes were subtitled in Hebrew.

Merchandise

DVD
 All 20 episodes of The Sandbaggers are available in the North American market in Region 0 NTSC-format DVD sets which were released by BFS Entertainment in August 2001 (Series 1 and 2) and September 2003 (Series 3).
 All 20 episodes are available in the UK and European market in Region 2 PAL-format DVD sets, the first two series being released by Network DVD in August 2005 and May 2006 respectively. (Unlike the BFS DVDs, the Network DVDs include in each episode the "bumpers" which led into and out of advertisement breaks during transmission on commercial television. These bumpers display "End of Part One", "Part Two", "End of Part Two" and "Part 3" accompanied by a snippet of the theme music.)

Video
 The complete series is also available on NTSC videotapes, in three sets. (Episode 7, "Special Relationship", was omitted from the Series One set and thus appears out of order on the Series Three set.)
 Four episodes were released on two PAL videocassettes in the mid-1980s, but these PAL tapes are out of print.

Books
 The Sandbaggers by Ian Mackintosh (Corgi Books, 1978) novelises "Always Glad to Help" and "A Feasible Solution". Out of print.
 The Sandbaggers: Think of a Number (Corgi Books, 1980) is an original novel by "Donald Lancaster", a pseudonym for mystery writer William Marshall, who was commissioned to write it after Ian Mackintosh's disappearance. Out of print.

Legacy

The Sandbaggers in America
Although not a huge ratings hit during its initial UK broadcast, The Sandbaggers generated a cult following when telecast abroad, most notably in the USA. PBS outlet KTEH in San Jose, California aired at least five runs of The Sandbaggers after it became "a local phenomenon".

American Sandbaggers fandom produced fanzines, websites, and even a convention: Ray Lonnen was the guest of honour at "Sandbagger One" in New Jersey in 1992.

Queen & Country
Greg Rucka, novelist and creator of the comic book espionage series Queen & Country, has said that the comic book is consciously inspired by The Sandbaggers and is in a sense a "quasi-sequel". In the comic book, the structure of SIS mirrors that seen in the television series, down to the division of responsibilities between Directors of Operations and Intelligence and the existence of a Special Operations Section known as the "Minders". The comic book also features a more modern and sophisticated Ops Room, and bureaucratic wrangling reminiscent of the television series.

Several characters and situations in Queen & Country parallel The Sandbaggers, including a fatherly "C" who is eventually replaced by a more political and less sympathetic appointee; a Director of Operations who is fiercely protective of the Special Section; a Deputy Chief antagonistic to the independent nature of the Minders; a rivalry with MI5; and a cooperative relationship with the CIA. In addition, several scenes and lines of dialogue are similar or allude to the television series. However, as the comic book takes place in the present day, the geopolitical situation is very different. In addition, the stories are more action-oriented and focus on the exploits of Minder Tara Chace rather than on Paul Crocker, the Director of Operations.

Bibliography 

 Mackintosh, Ian. (1978). The Sandbaggers. Corgi Children's.

See also
 List of The Sandbaggers characters
 Warship
 Ian Mackintosh
 Spooks

Notes

External links

The Ops Room (a fan site)
Was Ian Mackintosh a Spy?
British Film Institute Screen Online

1970s British drama television series
1980s British drama television series
1978 British television series debuts
1980 British television series endings
Espionage television series
ITV television dramas
Television series by ITV Studios
Television series by Yorkshire Television
English-language television shows